Glückliche Reise may refer to:

 , 1932 operetta by Eduard Künneke
 Bon Voyage (1933 film), German film of Künneke's operetta
 Bon Voyage (1954 film), German film of Künneke's operetta